Radislav Sekulić (born 27 September 1985) is a Montenegrin retired football striker.

Club career
Born in Titograd, SR Montenegro, he started playing with FK Budućnost Podgorica youth team and made the debut for the main team in the 2002–03 season of the Second League of FR Yugoslavia.  He played with Budućnost all the way until summer 2009 when he moved to another Montenegrin First League side, FK Mogren.  During the winter break of the 2009–10 season he moved abroad by joining Shanghai Zobon and playing with them in the 2010 China League One.  At the end of the season Pudong was relegated and Sekulić returned to Montenegro and played the second half of the 2010–11 season with FK Mladost Podgorica.  In the following summer he moved abroad again, this time to play with Budapest Honvéd FC in the 2011–12 Hungarian Championship.  After one season in Hungary, in summer 2012, he moved to Serbia and joined FK Bežanija. After playing one season in the Serbian First League where he scored 7 goals on 20 appearances, he moved to a SuperLiga Serbian side FK Čukarički in summer 2013

Honours
Budućnost
Montenegrin First League: 2007–08

References

External links
 Radislav Sekulić at Srbijafudbal

1985 births
Living people
Footballers from Podgorica
Association football forwards
Serbia and Montenegro footballers
Serbia and Montenegro under-21 international footballers
Montenegrin footballers
FK Budućnost Podgorica players
FK Mogren players
Pudong Zobon players
OFK Titograd players
Budapest Honvéd FC players
Budapest Honvéd FC II players
FK Bežanija players
FK Čukarički players
FK Sinđelić Beograd players
FK Zeta players
FK Lovćen players
First League of Serbia and Montenegro players
Montenegrin First League players
China League One players
Nemzeti Bajnokság I players
Serbian First League players
Serbian SuperLiga players
Montenegrin expatriate footballers
Expatriate footballers in China
Montenegrin expatriate sportspeople in China
Expatriate footballers in Hungary
Montenegrin expatriate sportspeople in Hungary
Expatriate footballers in Serbia
Montenegrin expatriate sportspeople in Serbia